The Military ranks of Chad are the military insignia used by the Chad National Army. Chad is a landlocked country, and does therefore not possess a navy. Being a former colony of France, Chad shares a rank structure similar to that of France.

In 2020, the National Assembly established and awarded the rank of Marshal to Idriss Déby.

Commissioned officer ranks
The rank insignia of commissioned officers.

Other ranks
The rank insignia of non-commissioned officers and enlisted personnel.

References

External links
 

Chad
Military of Chad